The 2022–23 NBA season is the 76th season of the National Basketball Association (NBA), the regular season began on October 18, 2022, and is scheduled to end on April 9, 2023. The 2023 NBA All-Star Game was played on February 19, 2023, at Vivint Arena in Salt Lake City. The playoffs are then scheduled to begin on April 15, 2023, and ending with the NBA Finals in June 2023. The Golden State Warriors are the defending NBA champions.

Transactions

Retirement
 On July 21, 2022, J. J. Barea announced his retirement from professional basketball. He won an NBA championship with the Dallas Mavericks in 2011 and multiple gold medals with the Puerto Rican national team.
 On August 20, 2022, Gustavo Ayón retired from professional basketball. He played three seasons in the NBA and won multiple titles in the EuroLeague and Spanish League in his 16-year career.
 On September 3, 2022, Jodie Meeks retired from professional basketball. He played for seven teams in his 13-year career and won an NBA championship with the Toronto Raptors in 2019.
 On September 6, 2022, Toure' Murry retired from professional basketball. He played for three teams in two NBA seasons, as well as numerous teams overseas.

Draft
The 2022 NBA draft took place on June 23, 2022, at Barclays Center in Brooklyn, New York. Paolo Banchero was selected with the first overall pick by the Orlando Magic.

Free agency
With the previous season's NBA Finals ending in June for the first time since 2019 before the COVID-19 pandemic began, the period for free agency returned to its normal July 1 starting date, along with the July moratorium period before players could begin signing new contracts.

In July 2022, the Philadelphia 76ers were charged with violating the league's moratorium in free agency discussions with P. J. Tucker and Danuel House and subsequently had two-second round picks rescinded by the league.

Coaching changes

Off-season
 On April 11, 2022, the Los Angeles Lakers fired Frank Vogel after missing the playoffs. In his three seasons with the team, Vogel led the team to two playoff appearances and the NBA championship in 2020.
 On April 11, 2022, the Sacramento Kings relieved interim head coach Alvin Gentry of his duties. Gentry was named interim head coach after the team fired Luke Walton in November 2021.
 On April 22, 2022, the Charlotte Hornets fired James Borrego after four years with the team with no playoff appearances.
 On May 9, 2022, the Sacramento Kings hired Golden State Warriors assistant coach Mike Brown to become the Kings' new head coach.
 On June 3, 2022, the Los Angeles Lakers hired Darvin Ham as their new head coach.
 On June 5, 2022, Quin Snyder resigned from his position as head coach of the Utah Jazz after eight seasons with the team.
 On June 24, 2022, the Charlotte Hornets hired Steve Clifford as their head coach for the second stint.
 On June 29, 2022, the Utah Jazz hired Will Hardy as their head coach.
 On September 22, 2022, the Boston Celtics suspended head coach Ime Udoka and named his assistant Joe Mazzulla as interim head coach. On February 16, Mazzulla was named permanent head coach.

In-season
 On November 1, 2022, the Brooklyn Nets and head coach Steve Nash agreed to part ways, and Jacque Vaughn served as interim head coach until November 9, when he was named permanent head coach.
 On February 21, 2023, the Atlanta Hawks fired Nate McMillan, who spent three seasons with the team. Joe Prunty, the team's assistant coach, was named the interim head coach. On February 26, the Hawks hired Quin Snyder as their head coach.

Preseason
The NBA often hosts preseason games in non-NBA markets, with the following being played domestically:

International games
Preseason contests in the NBA Global Games returned for the first time since the 2019 preseason, prior to the COVID-19 pandemic.

Regular season
The regular season schedule was released on August 17, 2022.

Eastern Conference

Western Conference

By conference

Notes
 y – Clinched division title
 x – Clinched playoff spot
 pi – Clinched play-in tournament spot
 * – Division leader
 o – Eliminated from postseason contention

International games
After nearly three years without an international regular season game due to the COVID-19 pandemic, the NBA brought back the NBA Global Games with two regular season matchups:

Statistics

Individual statistic leaders

Individual game highs

Team statistic leaders

Awards
Beginning with this season, the team who finished with the best overall regular season record would receive the Maurice Podoloff Trophy, named in honor of Maurice Podoloff, who served as the commissioner of the NBA from 1946 to 1963. The Podoloff Trophy was originally given to the NBA's Most Valuable Player of the regular season until . The MVP trophy was then renamed in honor of Michael Jordan, a five-time winner and often considered the greatest player in league history. A new award, the Clutch Player of the Year Award, was also introduced to honor players who best come through for their teammates in the clutch. This trophy was named after Jerry West.

The league also announced updated trophy designs for the Coach of the Year Award, Defensive Player of the Year Award, Executive of the Year Award, Most Improved Player Award, Rookie of the Year Award, Sixth Man of the Year Award, Sportsmanship Award, and the Teammate of the Year Award. The Defensive Player of the Year, Most Improved Player, Rookie of the Year and Sixth Man of the Year trophies were then renamed in honor of Hakeem Olajuwon, George Mikan, Wilt Chamberlain, and John Havlicek respectively.

Players of the Week
The following players were named the Eastern and Western Conference Players of the Week.

Players of the Month
The following players were named the Eastern and Western Conference Players of the Month.

Rookies of the Month
The following players were named the Eastern and Western Conference Rookies of the Month.

Coaches of the Month
The following coaches were named the Eastern and Western Conference Coaches of the Month.

Media
This is the seventh year of a nine-year deal with ABC, ESPN, TNT, and NBA TV. ESPN broadcasts Wednesday and Friday night games for most of the season, and games during selected Sunday nights from February to April. ABC airs NBA Saturday Primetime during eight selected Saturday nights between December and March, and NBA Sunday Showcase on three selected Sunday afternoons in February and early March. TNT airs Tuesday games all season, and Thursday games from January to April. NBA TV televises games primarily on Mondays all season, Saturday and Sunday nights for most of the season, Thursdays during the first half of the season, Fridays during the second half of the season, and any other time when neither ESPN/ABC nor TNT are airing games nationally.

Five Christmas Day games were scheduled for this season. The original plan for ABC was to air a tripleheader. However in October 2022, ESPN announced that all five of its Christmas Day games would be simulcast across both ABC and ESPN, likely as an attempt to counterprogram the NFL's scheduling of a Christmas Day tripleheader for the first time.

Four games were held on Martin Luther King Jr. Day, with TNT and NBA TV each airing two of them.

The NBA designed January 24–28 as "NBA Rivals Week", with every nationally televised game featuring "classic and budding rivalries between teams and players".

On the final day of the regular season, April 9, two games with playoff implications will be flexed into ESPN's afternoon doubleheader.

In September 2022, Ted Leonsis's Monumental Sports & Entertainment bought out NBCUniversal's ownership stake in NBC Sports Washington, which carries broadcasts of the Washington Wizards and the NHL's Washington Capitals, both Monumental-owned teams. Monumental initially took minority ownership of the network in 2016. NBC will provide transitional corporate, technical, and distribution support up to 18 months after the sale, and Monumental plans to rebrand the network after the 2022–23 season.

In October 2022, the Clippers launched a direct-to-consumer streaming service called ClipperVision. The service includes all non-national games.

On February 24, 2023, the AT&T SportsNet regional sports networks sent letters to the Houston Rockets and the Utah Jazz saying they had until March 31, 2023, to reach an agreement to take their local television rights back. Warner Bros. Discovery, the owners of the networks, intends to leave the regional sports networks business. If a deal is not reached the networks will file for Chapter 7 bankruptcy. The Portland Trail Blazers's deal with Root Sports Northwest is not affected because Warner Bros. Discovery only has minority control of that network.

On March 14, Diamond Sports Group, the operator of the Bally Sports regional sports networks, filed for Chapter 11 bankruptcy. Diamond plans to continue to broadcast games for the 16 NBA teams it has regional rights to while it plans to separate from majority parent Sinclair Broadcast Group as part of the reorganization.

Notable occurrences
 The NBA and NBPA announced a pension plan for former ABA players who played at least three seasons in the league.
 The Board of Governors approved the permanent adoption of the NBA Play-In Tournament that had been in place for the previous two seasons. Previously, the Board approved the tournament on a season-by-season basis.
 The league instituted a new penalty for the "take foul". The offensive team will be allotted one free throw and retain possession with this penalty in place. The defensive player who commits the foul will be assessed one common personal foul. Previously, the penalty was a common personal foul on the offending player in addition to a side out for the offensive team if they were not in the bonus.
 Following the death of 11-time champion Bill Russell, the NBA permanently retired the number 6 across the league, the first time a player's number has been retired across the league. However, players who had the number 6 beforehand can keep their number unless they voluntarily change it or retire.
 The NBA honored Russell with a jersey patch. Every team wore a commemorative patch on the right sleeve of their jerseys. Every NBA court honored Russell with a clover-shaped logo featuring the No. 6 on the sideline.
 On July 9, 2022, Nikola Jokić signed a five-year, $264 million supermax extension with the Denver Nuggets, the largest in league history.
 On September 13, 2022, the NBA and WNBA suspended Phoenix Suns owner Robert Sarver for one year after an independent investigation determined that he used the n-word multiple times, sexually harassed and assaulted multiple male and female employees, and engaged in demeaning behavior towards employees. 
 On September 21, Sarver announced he was exploring selling both the Suns and WNBA's Phoenix Mercury franchises.
 A record 23 Canadians appeared on opening-night rosters, marking the ninth consecutive season of Canada being the second-most represented country in the NBA.
 On October 19, 2022, Walker Kessler of the Utah Jazz became the first player to record a double-double, with 12 points and 10 rebounds while shooting 100% (5/5) in his rookie debut.
 On October 22, 2022, Paolo Banchero of the Orlando Magic became the first teenager to score 20 points or more in his first three games. This streak ended on his 7th game, where he scored 18 points on October 30, 2022.
 On October 28, 2022, DeMar DeRozan became the 50th player to score 20,000 points.
 On October 31, 2022, Kevin Durant passed Vince Carter for 19th place on the all-time scoring list.
 On November 4, 2022, Luka Dončić became the second NBA player to score 30 or more points in the first eight games of a season, joining Wilt Chamberlain.
 On November 4, 2022, the Golden State Warriors became the first defending champion to start the season 0–6 on the road.
 In commemoration of Election Day in the United States, the league did not schedule regular season games on November 8. The league, in turn, scheduled a full slate of games on November 7 with all 30 teams in action, with a unique schedule that saw staggered tip-offs every 15 minutes. The NBA mobile app aired commercial-free whiparound coverage on NBA CrunchTime.
 On November 13, 2022, Joel Embiid became the first player in NBA history to record 50+ points, 10+ rebounds, 5+ assists, and 5+ blocks in a game. He scored a career high 59 points along with 11 rebounds, eight assists, and seven blocks in a 105–98 victory over the Utah Jazz, with 26 points and five blocks coming in the fourth quarter.
 On December 10, 2022, former player and coach Paul Silas, the father of current Houston Rockets head coach Stephen died at the age of 79.
 On December 20, 2022, Robert Sarver accepted a deal made by an ownership group led by United Wholesale Mortgage's CEO Mat Ishbia and his older brother Justin Ishbia for a record-high price of $4 billion, breaking a record previously held by Joe Tsai when he purchased the Brooklyn Nets from Mikhail Prokhorov in 2019.
 On December 26, 2022, Duncan Robinson became the fastest player to hit 800 3-pointers. He did so in 263 consecutive games, surpassing the previous record held by Luka Dončić in 288 games, in a win against the Minnesota Timberwolves.
 On December 27, 2022, Luka Dončić became the first player in NBA history to record a 60-point, 20-rebound triple-double (60 points, 21 rebounds, and 10 assists) in a 126–121 comeback overtime victory over the New York Knicks.
 On December 29, 2022, Buddy Hield scored the fastest three point field goal since play-by-play was registered, by doing so in 3 seconds.
 On December 31, 2022, Luka Dončić became the first player in NBA history to record 250 points, 50 rebounds, and 50 assists in a five game span.
 On January 2, 2023, Donovan Mitchell became the seventh player in NBA history to score 70 or more points in a single game. He had 71 points, 11 assists, and eight rebounds in a win over the Chicago Bulls. He also became the first player in NBA history to score at least 70 points and record at least 10 assists.
 On January 10, 2023, the Miami Heat went 40 for 40 from the free throw line in a win against the Oklahoma City Thunder, breaking the record (39 for 39) set by the Utah Jazz in 1982.
 On January 13, 2023, the San Antonio Spurs set a regular season single-game attendance record with 68,323 people at the Alamodome in a game against the Golden State Warriors. The Spurs lost the game however.
 On January 15, 2023, LeBron James became the second player in NBA history to score 38,000 career points.
 On January 24, 2023, LeBron James became the first player to score 40 points against all 30 NBA teams with a 46-point performance against the Los Angeles Clippers.
 On January 31, 2023, Russell Westbrook surpassed Gary Payton for number 10 on the all-time assists list.
 On January 31, 2023, LeBron James became the first player to have a triple-double in his 20th season, accumulating 28 points, 10 rebounds, and 11 assists in a 129–123 overtime win over the New York Knicks.
 On February 6, 2023, the NBA's Board of Governors held a vote approving the sale of the Phoenix Suns to Mat Ishbia, with a 29–0 unanimous vote approving the sale, with only Dan Gilbert of the Cleveland Cavaliers abstaining from the vote. The move was then made official a day later.
 On February 7, 2023, LeBron James surpassed Kareem Abdul-Jabbar as the all-time leading scorer in NBA history in a game versus the Oklahoma City Thunder. He surpassed Kareem's 38,387 points with a fadeaway over Kenrich Williams.
 On February 26, 2023, Damian Lillard became the eighth player in NBA history to score 70 or more points in a single game, and the oldest to do so at the age of 32. He had 71 points, six rebounds and six assists, in a win over the Houston Rockets. He made 13 three-pointers, one shy of the NBA record. He is the only player in NBA history to score at least 70 points while making at least 10 three-pointers.

References

 
NBA
2022–23 in Canadian basketball
Current basketball seasons